Aechmea carvalhoi is a plant species in the genus Aechmea.

This bromeliad  species is endemic to the State of Bahia, and to the Atlantic Forest biome (Mata Atlantica Brasileira), located in southeastern Brazil.

References

carvalhoi
Endemic flora of Brazil
Flora of Bahia
Flora of the Atlantic Forest
Plants described in 1986